League of Super Evil (initialized as L.O.S.E. or LOSE) is a Canadian animated comedy television series inspired by the sketch "Once Were Heroes" by Ryan Harper-Brown, co-created by Philippe Ivanusic-Vallee, Davila LeBlanc and Peter Ricq and developed by Asaph Fipke. The series was produced by Nerd Corps Entertainment in association with YTV.

The series aired for 52 episodes from 7 March 2009 to 25 August 2012. Reruns ended on YTV on 2 September 2014, when Teletoon picked up for additional reruns; the series also aired in the UK on CBBC, in Australia on ABC1 and ABC3, and internationally on Cartoon Network, on Disney XD and on Nickelodeon.

Plot
The League of Super Evil (or "L.O.S.E.") is a group of so-called "supervillains" who are plotting to take over their neighborhood in Metrotown and the world ultimately but their plans usually involve pranks such as gluing a penny to a chair. While all the other citizens in the neighborhood live in suburban houses, The League has a "secret evil lair". The League is often at odds with other, more important and competent super villains such as Skullossus and also tries to avoid getting busted by Metrotown's heroes.

Episodes

Cast
 Scott McNeil as Voltar, Bolkar and Nightshade
 Lee Tockar as Doktor Frogg, Glory Guy, Steve and Doktor Squidd
 Colin Murdock as Red Menace, Skullossus and Justice Gene
 Tabitha St. Germain as Cougar, Lightning Liz and Nanny Boo Boo
 Blu Mankuma as General Sergeant

Production
When the series was first announced in October 2006, it under went many changes for the title and main characters; Voltar was originally called The Great Voltar. His costume was green and yellow instead of red. Doktor Frogg originally had a steel jaw and did not wear goggles. Red Menace was meant to be a former Soviet supervillain (hence his name). His original design wore a thick red fur coat and a fur hat that incorporated the Red Star (a communist symbol) on it. Doomageddon did not exist in the original concept. In his place was a crawling hooded character described as embodying "the spirit of a hyperactive Neanderthal toddler". The series title was originally just known as League of Evil.

Broadcast and release
League of Super Evil premiered on YTV in Canada on 7 March 2009. It aired on Saturdays at 10:30 a.m., as part of YTV's Crunch block. The series premiered earlier in the United States on Cartoon Network on 5 March 2009 at 9:00 p.m. It premiered in Latin America on Disney XD (LA) on 4 June 2011.

Reception
Emily Ashby of Common Sense Media gave the series a two out of five stars stating "Too-chaotic 'toon follows villains' mostly harmless antics."

Awards and nominations

References

2009 Canadian television series debuts
2012 Canadian television series endings
2000s Canadian animated television series
2010s Canadian animated television series
Canadian children's animated superhero television series
Canadian children's animated action television series
Canadian children's animated adventure television series
Canadian children's animated comedy television series
Canadian children's animated fantasy television series
Canadian computer-animated television series
English-language television shows
YTV (Canadian TV channel) original programming
Surreal comedy television series
Television series by DHX Media
Television shows set in British Columbia
Television shows filmed in Vancouver
Supervillain television shows